Sir William Davis Hughes (24 November 1910 – 16 March 2003) was an Australian politician. He was notable for his involvement in the controversial resignation of architect Jørn Utzon from the Sydney Opera House project in 1966.

Early life
Hughes was born in Launceston, Tasmania and was educated at Launceston High School and the University of Tasmania, although he did not graduate.  He married Joan Johnson in 1940 and they had one son and two daughters. He was a school teacher in Tasmania from 1927 until 1935, at Caulfield Grammar in Melbourne, from 1936 until he enlisted in the Royal Australian Air Force (RAAF), and at The Armidale School from 1947 until 1950.  He served in the RAAF from 1939 until 1945, achieving the rank of squadron leader.

Political career
Hughes was elected as a member of the New South Wales Legislative Assembly for Armidale from 1950 to 1953 and 1956 to 1973 for the Country Party. He was chosen to lead the party in 1958, but his term of office was brief because he was forced to resign in 1959 after it was revealed that he did not have the university degree which he claimed.

With the election of the Askin government in 1965, Hughes became Minister for Public Works, with responsibility for, among other things, the completion of the Sydney Opera House. Hughes refused to accept Jørn Utzon's approach to managing the Opera House project and, specifically, the construction of plywood prototypes for its interiors. Hughes refused to pay a fee claim for £51,000, which meant that Utzon could not pay his staff. After a heated discussion about the claim, Utzon sent a letter of withdrawal to Hughes on 28 February 1966, stating: "You have forced me to the leave the job". In his media announcement made only hours after receiving the letter, Hughes stated it was Utzon's 'resignation'.

The Opera House was completed by another architect, Peter Hall, an ex-government architect from Sydney. Taking on the project, Hall deemed Utzon's seating plan as unsafe, and to improve this he made radical changes to the interior design, a decision for which he would be largely criticised. Despite this, the Opera House was completed under his watch and it eventually opened in 1973.

Upon his resignation from parliament in January 1973, Hughes was appointed NSW Agent-General in London.

Later life 
Hughes died in Erina, New South Wales on 16 March 2003, aged 92.

Honours 
Hughes was knighted in 1975, two years after resigning from parliament.

Notes

1910 births
2003 deaths
Members of the New South Wales Legislative Assembly
Australian Knights Bachelor
National Party of Australia members of the Parliament of New South Wales
Politicians awarded knighthoods
Sydney Opera House
20th-century Australian politicians
Agents-General for New South Wales
People from Armidale
Royal Australian Air Force personnel of World War II
Royal Australian Air Force officers